

Asia

Bangladesh 

Bangladesh has 5 toll bridges and 4 toll roads. None of them are of an electronic collection system. In Bangladesh, roads and bridges are built by the Government. After building the roads and bridge, the governmement invites tender to give an Operation and management (O&M) contract for 5 years against a fee. The O&M operators maintains the bridge and collects toll on behalf of the government. The toll tariff of Bangabandhu Multipurpose Bridge (formerly known as Jamuna Bridge), length 4.8 km, the longest bridge of the country is considered very high compared with other bridges. Mr. Md. Mobarak Hossain, the CEO of Marga Net One Limited (Joint Venture by Pt. Jasa Marga (Persaro) Indonesia and Net One Solutions Ltd. Bangladesh who was also the CEO of the 2nd O&M Operator of Bangabandhu (Jamuna) Bridge, feels that Taka 400 (USD 6.00)per private car is too high, while the trucks and lorries pays a maximum of USD 18.00 for single trip. The Bangabandhu Bridge is a vital link connecting the eastern part of the country with its northern part.

China

Nearly all Chinese expressways and express routes charge tolls, although they are not often networked from one toll expressway to another. However, beginning with the Jingshen Expressway, tolls are gradually being networked. Given the size of the nation, however, the task is rather difficult.

China National Highways, which are not expressways, but "grade-A" routes, also charge tolls. Some provincial, autonomous-regional and municipal routes, as well as some major bridges, will also charge passage fees. In November 2004, legislation in China provided for a minimum length of a stretch of road or expressway in order for tolls to be charged.

Hong Kong

In Hong Kong, most tunnels and some bridges that form part of the motorway networks are tolled to cover construction and maintenance costs. Some built recently are managed in the Build-Operate-Transfer (BOT) basis. The companies which build the tunnels or bridges are given franchise of a certain length of time (usually 30 years) to operate. Ownership will be transferred to the government when the franchise expires. An example is the Cross-Harbour Tunnel.

India 

Access-controlled roads in India are tolled. In addition to cash tolls, toll plazas have dedicated electronic toll collection lanes for quicker operation.

In addition, most of the upgraded sections of the National Highway network are also tolled. These tolls are lower than those on expressways.

Currently, a massive project is underway to expand the highway network and the Government of India plans to add an additional  of expressways to the network by the year 2022.

Indonesia 

Indonesia opened its first toll road, the Jagorawi Toll Road, in 1978. This linked the capital city of Jakarta to the neighboring cities of Bogor and Ciawi south of the capital. 
Today, the system is still limited in its existence, as major toll routes remain in and around the major cities of Jakarta, Bandung, Surabaya, and Semarang. 
Recently, development in inter–city routes has increased. In 2005, the Cipularang Toll Road connecting Bandung in West Java to Jakarta was completed. This is a major development for the Indonesian transport system, as a drive between Jakarta and Bandung can now be completed in just under 3 hours.

In 2015, the Cikampek–Palimanan Toll Road connecting Jakarta and Cirebon in West Java was completed. This is another major development as this Toll Road connects Jakarta–Cikampek Toll Road and Palimanan–Kanci Toll Road, and a drive between Jakarta and Central Java using this Toll Road can now be completed around 4 hours.

Indonesia had 34 toll roads until October 2015 :

North Sumatra : 
Belmera, connecting North Sumatra.

Jakarta and Banten : 
Jakarta–Serpong Toll Road, Jakarta–Tangerang Toll Road, Tangerang–Merak Toll Road, 
Prof. Dr. Ir. Soedijatmo Toll Road, connecting Jakarta and Banten.

Jakarta :
Jakarta Inner Ring Road, Jakarta Outer Ring Road, connecting Jakarta.

Jakarta and West Java :
Jakarta–Cikampek Toll Road, Jagorawi Toll Road, connecting West Java and Jakarta.

West Java :
Cipularang Toll Road, Padaleunyi Toll Road, Bogor Ring Road, Cikampek–Palimanan Toll Road, Palimanan–Kanci Toll Road, Kanci–Pejagan Toll Road, connecting West Java.

Semarang, Central Java :
Semarang Section A, B, C Toll Road, Semarang–Ungaran Toll Road connecting Semarang.

East Java :
Surabaya–Gresik Toll Road, Surabaya–Gempol Toll Road, Waru–Juanda International Airport Toll Road, 
Surabaya–Madura Bridge Toll Road, connecting East Java.

Denpasar, Bali Island :
Bali Mandara Toll Road, connecting Ngurah Rai Airport–Nusa Dua, Ngurah Rai Airport–Denpasar–Benoa.

Makasar, South Sulawesi :
Makassar Airport Toll Road, connecting Sultan Hasanuddin International Airport.	
 
Plans for another inter–city route in Central Java between the cities of Semarang and Surakarta are under development. Eventually, the whole city in island of Java will be connected by Trans–Java toll road from Merak, Banten to Ketapang, East Java. If the Sunda Strait Bridge is built, the highway network in Java and Sumatra will be connected. By 2025, Indonesia may be connected with the Asia by Malacca Strait Bridge and Trans-Sumatra Toll Road. Indonesia also has a project to build Trans-Kalimantan Toll Road and Trans-Sulawesi Toll Road.

Since October 2017, all toll booths in Indonesia only accepts electronic payments through payment cards.

Israel

Highway 6 in Israel, widely known as the Trans-Israel Highway or Cross-Israel Highway, is to date the only electronic toll highway in Israel. Currently Highway 6 is 110 km long, all of which is a freeway. This figure will grow in the next few years as additional segments, currently undergoing statutory approvals and permitting processes, are added to the main section of the road. Highway 6 uses a system of cameras and transponders to toll vehicles automatically. There are no toll booths, allowing Highway 6 to be designed as a normal freeway with interchanges.

Japan 

The vast majority of Japan's extensive expressway consists of toll roads. Payment of the fare can either be made in cash as one exits or using the electronic toll collection card system.  As of 2001 the toll fees for an ordinary passenger car was 24.60 yen per kilometre plus a 150 yen terminal charge.

Malaysia 

Malaysia has extensive toll roads that forms the majority of country's expressways which in length spans more than 1400 km ranging North to the Thai border, South to the Causeway and Second Link to Singapore, West to Klang and Pulau Indah and East towards Kuantan.  Most of the toll roads are in major cities and conurbations such as Klang Valley, Johor Bahru and Penang.  All of Malaysian toll roads are managed in the Build-Operate-Transfer basis as in Hong Kong and Japan (see below).

Pakistan

All motorways and few expressways are toll roads. First such motorway M2 was opened to public in 1997. Since then the M3, M9, M10, and M1, all toll roads, have become operational. The M8 is under construction.

Philippines 

Currently, the Philippines have ten toll roads, all on the main Island of Luzon.

The 84 kilometer North Luzon Expressway or NLEx, connecting Manila with the Central and Northern parts of Luzon. It starts at Balintawak Interchange in Quezon City, Metro Manila and ends at Sta. Ines in Pampanga.

The 93.77 kilometer Subic–Clark–Tarlac Expressway or SCTEx, connecting the Subic Bay Freeport Zone, Clark Freeport Zone, and the Central Techno Park in Tarlac City, Tarlac. It is also connected to the North Luzon Expressway via a Spur Road in Mabalacat, Pampanga which makes it the continuation of the connection of Manila to the provinces of Central and Northern parts of Luzon. It is the longest expressway in the Philippines.

The 51 kilometer South Luzon Expressway or SLEx connecting Manila with Santo Tomas, Batangas. It is composed of two segments namely, the Osmeña Highway (formerly/also known by many as South Superhighway) which starts from Paco, Manila and continues until Alabang in Muntinlupa and the Alabang-Calamba-Santo Tomas Expressway, which is also known as the South Luzon Tollway (SLT), which comprises the Alabang to Santo Tomas, Batangas segment.

The 16 kilometer Metro Manila Skyway or simply Skyway is an elevated expressway that connects Manila with Alabang, Muntinlupa which is located above the SLEX.

The 42 kilometer Southern Tagalog Arterial Road or STAR Tollway which runs south from Santo Tomas, Batangas to the City of Batangas. It is also connected to the South Luzon Expressway via an exit in Santo Tomas, Batangas since 2010 which makes it the continuation of the connection of Manila to the provinces of the Southern part of Luzon as it also a part or extension of the Radial Road 3 network (see Radial Road 3).

The 14 kilometer Manila–Cavite Expressway or CAVITEx is an expressway in the south of the Manila metropolitan area. Connects Manila with the province of Cavite.

The 88.85 kilometer Tarlac–Pangasinan–La Union Expressway is a four lane expressway north of Manila in the Philippines. It connects Central Luzon and North Luzon. It starts at SCTEX in Tarlac Exit and currently ends at Rosario Exit in La Union.

The 8.8 km Subic Freeport Expressway or the NLEx Segment 7 was a two lane expressway in which the alignment traverses the provinces of Zambales and Bataan. It begins at Rizal Highway in Hermosa, Bataan and ends at Subic Freeport Zone/SBMA at Olongapo, Zambales.

The 4 km Muntinlupa–Cavite Expressway, which is also known as MCX and formerly Daang Hari-SLEX Link Expressway is a long access-controlled toll expressway linking the southern province of Cavite to Muntinlupa in the Philippines. The east end is the SLEX in Muntinlupa and the west end is at Daang Hari and Daang Reyna Road junction in Cavite.

The 11.6 kilometer NAIA Expressway is an elevated expressway that runs from the Metro Manila Skyway to Jose Diokno Boulevard, and Ninoy Aquino Avenue and NAIA Road near Ninoy Aquino International Airport Terminal 3. This elevated expressway project is divided into 4 packages. This is also the first airport expressway in the Philippines. It is located in Pasay and Parañaque, and a little portion in Taguig.

Only the North Luzon Expressway, Subic–Clark–Tarlac Expressway, and the South Luzon Expressway (including the Skyway) have an electronic toll collection system, which is based on the 5.7 GHz standard.

Singapore 

In Singapore, toll stations are automated, thus reducing manpower. The automated toll stations, also known to the locals as ERP or Electronic Road Pricing, was introduced by Land Transport Authority (LTA) to reduce city traffic jams. The number of toll stations is increasing rapidly and some Singaporeans even call it "Every road pay".

Sri Lanka 

Sri Lanka currently operates 2 toll roads. The Southern Expressway (E 01) and the Katunayake Expressway (E 03). The Kandy Colombo Expressway (E 02) is under planning at the moment (2013). The toll revenue is used to repair and maintain the expressways.

Taiwan 

Freeways in Taiwan are not exactly toll roads in the sense that toll gates/stations are not located at the entrance and exits of the freeway.  Toll stations with weigh stations are located every thirty to forty kilometres on the No. 1 and No. 3 National Freeways of the Republic of China. There are usually no freeway exits once a toll station notification sign appears, making it necessary for the driver to be familiar with the locations of the toll stations in advance.

See Highway System in Taiwan#Toll station for more detailed information.

Other toll roads in Taiwan are usually newly built bridges and tunnels. Tolls are frequently collected to pay off the construction cost and once paid off, the tolls may be repealed.

Tajikistan 
Toll roads in Tajikistan are owned and operated by Innovative Road Solutions (IRS). The northern point is in the Sughd Viloyat and the Southern point ends at Kurgan Tyube (100 km south of the capital of the country - Dushanbe). While going from end to end costs roughly $12 US Dollars for regular 2 axle vehicles, it can top to $100 for semitrucks. The IRS is setting up new toll plazas that are going to be able to read off the digital device attached to windshield while passing through at the speed of no more than 15 km/h, similar to ones in the United States. This is the only toll road in the entire Central Asia with about 5 cars going through each toll plaza every minute in every direction. The more information can be found on their homepage at www.IRS.tj

Thailand 
Most of the toll roads in Thailand are either within Greater Bangkok or originated from Bangkok.  They are called expressways, tollways, and motorways.  Two government agencies under the Ministry of Transport, namely the Expressway Authority of Thailand (EXAT) and the Department of Highways (DoH), own networks of toll roads.  Some are operated by the agencies themselves; others are operated by private concessionaires.  EXAT is in charge of Chaloem Mahanakhon Expressway, Si Rat Expressway, Chalong Rat Expressway, Udon Ratthaya Expressway, Burapha Withi Expressway and Kanchanphisek Outer Ring Road (southern section).  DoH is in charge of Uttraphimuk Tollway (formerly Don Mueang Tollway), Motorway No. 7 (Bangkok-Chonburi), and Motorway No. 9 (Kanchanphisek Outer Ring Road - eastern section).  Both agencies have plans to build more toll roads in the future, expanding their networks to the provinces.

Electronic Toll Collection using passive RFID tags is used in Chaloem Mahanakhon, Si Rat, Chalong Rat, and Burapha Withi Expressway while Uttraphimuk Tollway employs passive IC-card-based Touch-and-Go system.  There are plans to upgrade and expand ETC systems in the near future.

United Arab Emirates 
The toll system Salik started in Dubai in July 2007.

Africa

Morocco

Morocco has an extensive system of toll roads or Autoroutes. These were for the most part recently built, and from Casablanca connect all of Moroccos major cities such as Marrakech, Rabat, and Tangier. Operator Autoroutes Du Maroc runs the network on a pay-per-use basis, with toll stations placed along its length. Goal is completing a North-South and an East-West link crossing the country. Both axis will be important sections of the Pan-African main links.

Mozambique
The Mozambique South Africa Tollway was established in 2014 and is run by private contractors leasing the highway from the Mozambican Government and tolls will be established on many other important paved roads in Mozambique

South Africa
In South Africa, some of the National routes have sections that are toll roads (with physical tollgates), namely the N1, N2, N3, N4 & N17. In cities such as Cape Town, the freeways are free of charge. However, with the introduction of electronic tolling (e-tolls) as part of the Gauteng Freeway Improvement Project, tolls were introduced on the upgraded the urban freeways that are National Roads in the province of Gauteng, which includes Johannesburg and Pretoria. These Gauteng tolls met resistance in the media and from parts of the population. Toll roads are run by the South African National Roads Agency Limited or in the case of routes like the N3 and N4, by concessionaires.

Zimbabwe
In 2013 the Ntabazinduna Toll Plaza was opened outside of Bulawayo on the A5 Road to Harare and the toll system was introduced by a South African Group named Group Five as part of a government project to provide safer highways and to also benefit the local community and also the local economy. Additionially eight more toll plazas will be operating in Zimbabwe.

Zambia 
In Zambia, every Inter-Territorial Road (designated with the letter T), together with many Territorial Roads (designated with the letter M) and very few District Roads (designated with the letter D) are toll roads with tollgates. The tollgates are run by the National Road Fund Agency (NRFA) and the Road Development Agency (RDA).

Europe 

Toll roads in Europe have a long history. The first turnpike road in England was authorised in the seventeenth century. The term turnpike refers to a gate on which sharp pikes would be fixed as a defence against cavalry. Early references include the (mythical) Greek ferryman Charon charging a toll to ferry (dead) people across the river Acheron. Germanic tribes charged tolls to travellers across mountain passes. Tolls were used in the Holy Roman Empire in the 14th century and 15th century.

In some European countries payment of road tolls is made using stickers which are affixed to the windscreen. Germany uses a system based on satellite technology for large vehicles.  In other countries payment may be made in cash, by credit card, by pre-paid card or by an electronic toll collection system. Tolls may vary according to the distance travelled, the building and maintenance costs of the motorway and the type of vehicle.

Some of these toll roads are privately owned and operated.  Others are owned by the government.  Some of the government-owned toll roads are privately operated.

Belarus 
Major highways in Belarus are toll roads with Open road tolling (ORT) or free-flow tolling. BelToll is an electronic toll collection system (ETC), valid from 1 July 2013 in the Republic of Belarus.

Croatia 

Almost all Croatian highways are toll roads with the exception of the Zagreb bypass and Rijeka bypass. 

There are five vehicle categories in Croatia that differ in weight, height, number of axles and trailer attachment. The toll for the use of a motorway on which a closed or open toll system has been introduced is calculated and charged according to the distance between the two toll points the vehicle passes, the group of vehicles to which the vehicle is deployed and the unit price per kilometer. The unit price per kilometer of motorway, ie. individual sections of motorway, is determined according to construction costs, maintenance costs, management costs and costs of development of motorways and toll road facilities. The unit price per kilometer can be determined differently for each section of the motorway.

Toll payment is possible in six ways:

 Cash payment: Croatian kunas and Euros
 Card payment: Visa, Mastercard, Maestro, Diners Card, American Express, INA card, MOL card

 Subscription cards (smart): AZM smart card

 Unique smart card for all motorways in the Republic of Croatia for people with disabilities entitled to free tolls

 ENC - Electronic toll collection: HAC, Bina Istra

 Toll surcharge via SMS and via WEB portal

There are three Croatian companies that build and maintain highways and collect tolls:

 Hrvatske autoceste (Croatian Motorways Ltd)
 Autocesta Zagreb - Macelj (Zagreb - Macelj Motorway)
 BINA Istra

Denmark 
The Great Belt Fixed Link the Øresund Bridge and Fjord Link Frederikssund (Crown Princess Mary's Bridge) are toll roads.

In the Faroe Islands, the inter-island road tunnels Vágatunnilin and Norðoyatunnilin both have tolls (but no physical toll booths are present and the toll must be paid at nearby petrol stations).

France 

In Europe, the most substantial use of toll roads is in France, where most of the autoroutes carry quite heavy tolls.

Iceland 
The Hvalfjörður Tunnel was tolled from 11 July 1998 but became toll free as of 28 September 2018. Currently the Vaðlaheiðargöng tunnel, opened in December 2018, is the only toll road in Iceland.

Ireland 
The Republic of Ireland has three toll roads, three toll bridges, and two toll tunnels, which are operated by various independent operators. Most were built under a public-private partnership system, giving the company which arranged for the road to be built the right to collect tolls for a defined period. Tolls vary from €1.65 to €12 for cars.

Italy 

Most Italian motorways are toll roads, with some exceptions such as some motorways in Southern Italy and Sicily or the Grande Raccordo Anulare (Rome's ring road).

In most motorways, toll is proportional to the distance traveled and has to be paid on exit, where toll gates —  caselli — are placed. On other motorways, however, toll gates are placed directly along the route —  barriere —. In such cases, it is required to pay a fixed amount, regardless of the distance traveled. A8, A9, A52 are good examples of that system.

Toll can be paid in cash, by credit card, by pre-paid card, or by Telepass.

61% of the Italian motorways are handled by the "Autostrade per l'Italia S.p.A." company, and its subsidiaries. All of these carriers are now privately owned and supervised by ANAS. The network of motorways covers most of Italy: northern and central Italy are well covered, the south and Sicily are scarcely covered, Sardinia is not covered at all.

The motorway operators are required to build, operate and maintain their networks at cost and to cover their expenses from the toll they collect. The tolls vary according to the building and maintenance costs of the motorway and the type of vehicle.

Besides the motorways, only some alpine tunnels (such as the Mont Blanc Tunnel) are tolled. Today, no toll is required on other roads, including motorway-like dual carriageways —  superstrade. The first tolled superstrada is under construction now north of Venice.

The Netherlands 
In the beginning of the 20th century, almost all communities collected toll on all passing traffic, usually including pedestrians and livestock. In 1953, the central government abolished all communal tolls.

As of 2008, there are three effective toll roads in Netherlands. They are for the Western Scheldt Tunnel, Kil tunnel, both major arteries, and the "Tolbrug" (Toll Bridge) in Nieuwerbrug, a local hand-drawn bridge. Also, for the Wijkertunnel, a "shadow toll" is paid by Rijkswaterstaat for each passed vehicle.

Norway 

Norway has extensively been using toll as a way to finance road infrastructure in the last decades. The toll is called "bompenger" (gate coin) which from comes the first toll roads in Norway, private roads where owners were allowed to charge traffic. The toll ends when the road has been paid off.

There are also toll rings around some cities, where drivers have to pay to enter or leave the city, regardless of if the road is new or old. The first city was Bergen in 1986. The money goes to construction of infrastructure in and around the city.

Poland 

There are three toll highways in Poland, connecting the major cities and the nation's boundaries. Two routes travel east–west, one running between Łódź and the German border, the other currently connecting Katowice and Kraków, with current construction extending the roads to the German and Ukrainian boundaries. A north–south route connects Rybnik to Katowice, and Toruń to Gdańsk.

Portugal 
In Portugal a certain number of roads are designated Toll-Roads. They charge a fixed value per kilometre distance, with several classes depending on vehicle type and regulated by the government. Several authorised franchises run them, the largest at present being BRISA. For cash-free payments there exists the Via Verde, an electronic toll collection system. On leaving the motorway, charges are automatically debited from a bank account.

Russia 
A number of toll roads in Barnaul and Pskov Region (Nevil-Velezh (RUR 190 ($8)), Pechori-state border RUR 140), also M4-Don (18 km close to Lipetsk costs RUR20($0,75) for cars and RUR40 ($1,7) for trucks).

Overall toll network is 383 km or 0,05% of total road network. Average price in Pskov region having 226 km of toll roads is RUR 2,4-5,5 per km for cars, and RUR 7,9-19,5 for trucks. This comes close to $0,5 per km for trucks.

Ordinary speed limits apply so far. In 2007 adopted Toll Road Law and Concession Law in 2005 to develop this sector.

Slovenia 
For the use of 464,7 km of the Slovenian freeways and expressways use of toll stickers is obligatory for all vehicles with the permissible maximum weight of 3.5 tons on motorways and expressways as of 1 July 2008. The sticker costs are €15 for 7 days, €30 for a month and €95 for a year. Motorcyclists have to pay €7.50 for 7 days, €25 for a half year and €47.50 for a year. Trucks use existing toll road stops. Use of highways and expressways without a valid and properly displayed sticker in a vehicle is a violation of the law and is punished with a fine of €300 or more.

Due to the high costs of toll stickers for transit drivers going to vacation to Croatian and Montenegrin coast and others only passing through Slovenia, the highways are avoided by some travellers. Brussels had opened the case with the statement that the Slovenian vignette violates prevailing EU rights and discriminates road users. The European commissioner for traffic and transport, Antonio Tajani, had investigated in the case of discrimination.  On 28 January 2010, after short-term vignettas were introduced by Slovenia and some other changes were made to the Slovenian vignette system, the European Commission concluded that the vignette system is in accordance with the European law.

Spain 
Most Spanish toll roads are networked, so you must get a ticket on entering and pay when leaving the road. Technically, all roads belong to the Government, although toll roads are built and maintained by private companies under a State concession; when the concession expires, the road is reverted to State ownership, however most of then are renewed. Toll roads are called in Spanish autopistas. Freeways, often comparable to autopistas in building and ride quality, are called  autovías.

There are some autovías which are actually built and maintained by private companies, such as Pamplona-Logroño A-12 or Madrid access road M45. The company assumes the building costs and the Autonomous Community where they are located (in the given examples, Navarre and Madrid) pays a yearly per-vehicle fee to the company based upon usage statistics, called "shadow toll" (in Spanish, peaje en la sombra). The system can be regarded as a way for the Government to finance the build of new roads at the expense of the building company. Also, since the payment starts only after the road is finished, construction delays are usually shorter than those of regular state-owned freeways. However, those cannot be classified as toll roads since drivers do not need to pay any fees.

Sweden 

The border-crossing Oresund Bridge has around €50 toll. Two other bridges, including Sundsvall Bridge (and until 2021 also the Svinesund Bridge) have tolls of smaller amounts. The Stockholm and Gothenburg City areas have congestion pricing on entry or exit. Before the year 2000 road tolls did not exist in Sweden for several decades.

Switzerland 

For the use of Swiss motorways the use of toll stickers is obligatory. They costs CHF 40 per year per vehicle (a car towing a trailer needs two stickers). There are no stickers for shorter periods and they are valid 14 months (the 2010 sticker is valid from 1 December 2009 until 31 January 2011). However, this also means that a sticker bought any time during the year can only be used for less than the maximum period until 31 January of the following year.

Republic of Turkey 

In the Republic of Turkey toll is collected on certain highways, the so-called Otoyol or Karayolu. This is done so by three different systems. Every toll road has lanes for all three payment methods. One method is KGS (Kartlı Geçiş Sistemi) (English: Card passage system) which requires a Prepaid card to be presented at the toll port. Every passing will be withdrawn from the card. Another method is HGS (Hızlı Geçiş Sistemi) (English: Fast passage system.) which uses a RFID chip stuck to the windshield of the vehicle. This chip is scanned automatically when passing the toll collecting point and money will be automatically withdrawn from the connected bank account. The last system is OGS which is calles Otomatik Geçiş Sistemi in Turkish, and translates Automatic passage system in English. This form of payment requires a fixed amount of money to be paid for a monthly or annual subscription. When subscribed, your car will be equipped with a barcoded sticker, which will be checked by CCTV cameras automatically to check if the car is actually subscribed. The Turkish toll system can't be avoided (except for avoiding toll roads), because one can simply not pass KGS without the required card, and due to the cameras, all cars passing OGS and HGS with no or expired or counterfied chips or stickers will get a fine nicely presented at their home address.

United Kingdom 

Road rates were introduced in England in the seventeenth century. The first turnpike road, whereby travellers paid tolls to be used for road upkeep, was authorised in 1663 for a section of the Great North Road in Hertfordshire.  The first turnpike trust was established by Parliament through a Turnpike Act in 1706. From 1751 until 1772 there was a flurry of interest in turnpike trusts and a further 390 were established. By 1825 over 1,000 trusts controlled 25,000 miles (40,000 km) of road in England and Wales.

The rise of railway transport largely halted the improving schemes of the turnpike trusts. Unable to earn sufficient revenue from tolls alone the trusts took to requiring taxes from the local parishes. The system was never properly reformed but from the 1870s Parliament stopped renewing the acts and roads began to revert to local authorities, the last trust vanishing in 1895. The Local Government Act 1888 created county councils and gave them responsibility for maintaining the major roads. There are still a small number of toll bridges left including Swinford toll bridge near Oxford.

Most UK roads today are maintained from general taxation, some of which is raised from motoring taxes including fuel duty and vehicle excise duty.  Today, there are few tolls on roads in the United Kingdom - mainly toll bridges and tunnels. Until recently there were only two toll roads to which there is a public right of way (Rye Road in Stanstead Abbotts and College Road in Dulwich) together with another five or so private toll-roads. The M6 Toll motorway to the north of Birmingham levies a usage charge.

North and South America

Brazil 
In Brazil, toll roads are a recent institution, and were adopted mostly in non-federal highways. The state of São Paulo has the highest length of toll roads, which are exploited either by private companies which bought a concession from the state, or by a state owned company (see Highway system of São Paulo). In São Paulo there is also a statewide electronic collection system using a plastic transponder (e-tag) attached to the windscreen, named SemParar'''. There is a growing trend towards tolling in all major highways of the country, but some resistance by the population is beginning to be felt, particularly due to some abuses which are being imposed, restricting the constitutional rights of coming and going (because the Brazilian highway system has very few non-tolled vicinal roads in parallel to highways) and making some trips an extremely expensive affair, as compared to average Brazilian earning power (in São Paulo, a 1,000 km round trip may cost upward of two hundreds Brazilian real in some roads, higher than petrol expenses).

 Canada 
Most tolled roadways in Canada are bridges to the United States, although a few domestic bridges in some provinces have tolls.  Toll highways disappeared, for the most part, in the 1970s and 1980s.  In the 1990s, political pressure dropped the new tolls on an upgraded section of the Trans-Canada Highway in New Brunswick. Highway 407 in the Greater Toronto Area is a modern toll route and does not have collection booths but an overhead sensor. It's heavily criticized as the government leased it for 99 years with the company having unlimited control of the highway and tolls so it is expensive, but still a necessity for gridlocked Toronto. Nova Scotia has a toll highway on the Trans Canada Highway between Debert and Oxford.

 Colombia 
Many highways in Colombia charge tolls. Motorcycles are allowed to bypass for free.

 Ecuador 
The Pan-American Highway in Ecuador charges tolls. Motorcycles pay a reduced fare.

 Mexico 
Mexico has an extensive system of toll roads or Autopistas. Autopistas are built and funded by Federal taxes and are built to nearly identical standards as the US Interstate Highways System. Also, many states in Mexico have their own toll roads such as Puebla, Veracruz and Nuevo León.
All federal toll highways operate with 3 payment options, cash, credit card and electronic tag IAVE.
IAVE in all the highways is operated by Caminos y Puentes Federales (CAPUFE).

 Panama 
Most of the toll roads in Panama were built in the mid 1990s, with the exception of the Arraijan-Chorrerra Highway. The three modern toll roads were built after the transportation plan made by the Government of Japan in the mid 1980s using the BOT formula. This highways are the Corredor Norte in the north of the Panama City, and the Corredor Sur in the south. Another highway was built and is the Panama-Colon Highway.

 Puerto Rico 
There are several toll roads in Puerto Rico, where toll roads are called "autopista" (which loosely translates to "car track") and toll houses are called "peaje".

 United States 

A toll road in the United States, especially near the east coast, is often called a turnpike. The term turnpike originated from the turnstile or gate which blocked passage until the fare was paid at a toll house (or toll booth'' in current terminology). Most tolled facilities in the US today use an electronic toll collection system as an alternative to paying cash. Examples of this are the E-ZPass system used on most toll bridges and toll roads in the eastern U.S. from North Carolina to Maine and Illinois; Houston's EZ Tag, which also works in other parts of the state of Texas, Oklahoma's Pikepass (which also works in Texas and Kansas), California's FasTrak, Illinois' I-Pass, and Florida's SunPass. Toll roads are only in 26 states as of 2006. The majority of states without any turnpikes are in the West and South.

After a halt in toll road construction following the establishment of the Interstate Highway System in 1956, many states are going back to implementing tolls to fund capital improvements and manage congestion.  This is because the cost of expanding and maintaining the highway network is increasing faster than the amount of revenue that can be generated by the federal gasoline tax for the Highway Trust Fund.  Years after abolishing tolls, Kentucky and Connecticut have both re-examinined the possibility of reinstating tolls on some highways, while several other states are advancing the construction of new toll roads to supplement their existing networks of toll-free expressways.

Oceania

Australia 
In Australia, a small number of motorways have been tolled due to cover the expense of their construction. Such roads can be found in the Australian cities of Brisbane, Sydney and Melbourne. There are no toll roads in the Australian states of South Australia, Western Australia, Tasmania or any of the mainland territories. Toll collection is by electronic toll collection; there are no longer any cash booths in Australia.

In Brisbane, there are three tollway operators (Brisbane City Council, Queensland Motorways, and RiverCity Motorway).  Brisbane City Council owns and operates the Go Between Bridge over the Brisbane River in the city.  Queensland Motorways operates the tolls on the Sir Leo Hielscher Bridges, and another two on the Logan Motorway on the south side.  RiverCity Motorway operates the Clem Jones Tunnel, which runs underneath the city between the inner southern and northern suburbs.  All toll collection points are electronically operated. Another company, BrisConnections, is currently constructing another toll tunnel (the longest tunnel in Australia) called the Airport Link, and will allow traffic to flow from the northern Clem Jones - Inner City Bypass interchange, direct to Brisbane Airport.  Construction is due to be complete in 2012. International Travellers and people that are new to Brisbane should note, the penalty for non payment of tolls is in excess of $140 (per trip). It is best to avoid toll roads at all costs as it really saves little time and is often classed by the general Brisbane public as "revenue raising".

In Melbourne, there are two companies that operate tollways within the Melbourne metropolitan area. Transurban operates CityLink covering sections of the Monash Freeway, Southern Link, Western Link and the upgraded sections of the Tullamarine Freeway. ConnectEast operates EastLink that runs through the Eastern Suburbs of Melbourne. All Melbourne tollways are electronically tolled. The West Gate Bridge opened as a toll bridge upon its completion in 1978, however the toll was abolished in 1985.

In Sydney, many of the motorways contain at least one tolled section with a mixture of government and private ownership. The State Government owns the Sydney Harbour Bridge and Sydney Harbour Tunnel, while the M2 Motorway, M4 Motorway, M5 Motorway, Eastern Distributor, Westlink M7 and Lane Cove Tunnel are privately operated by a variety of companies such as Macquarie Infrastructure, Transurban, and to a lesser extent Industry Super funds such as Retail Employees Super, SunSuper, and the Industry Funds Management which partly own the M5 motorway in South Western Sydney.

As well as the tolled motorways, the Cross City Tunnel - an east–west route underneath the Sydney CBD - was opened to traffic in 2005. This road has become somewhat controversial due to the relatively high toll charge and the closure of surrounding roads designed to funnel traffic through the tunnel.

All Sydney tollways accept E-tags; the Westlink M7, Sydney Harbour Tunnel, Cross City Tunnel, Lane Cove Tunnel and from 1 December 2007 on the M2 Motorway   have no cash booths, just E-Tag readers to zoom on through as they charge their tolls only through electronic tolling methods or through the use of number plate reading as you go through, then you have to pay after a certain time frame (for example; before 24 hours), otherwise you will get a fine in the mail. The M5 Motorway moved to electronic only tolling in 2013. Tolls on the M4 Motorway were abolished in 2010. An E-Tag is an RFID device that allow a driver to pass through a toll point without physically stopping. When a vehicle fitted with an E-Tag passes through a toll collection point, the E-Tag identifies the electronic account of the vehicle passing through and the toll-road operator recovers the toll via that account. There are four providers of E-tag accounts in New South Wales (RTA, RoamTag, Interlink Roads, and M2 Consortium). All tags provided by these four providers can be used on every E-Tag-enabled tollway in Australia.

New Zealand 
 Auckland Harbour Bridge was opened in 1959 and operated as a toll bridge until 1984. In the 1960s a group of university students attempted to disrupt the toll system by repeatedly crossing the bridge using motor-scooters (to which a very low toll applied), and paying their toll in £5 notes; the hope was that they would exhaust the supplies of change held at the toll booths. However, the toll authority got wind of their plans and got a very large supply of small change (copper coinage), so the students were soon weighed down with large amounts of small change.
 The Lyttelton Road Tunnel, linking the City of Christchurch with the harbour at Lyttelton, was originally a Toll Tunnel built in 1962. The government of the day promised that as soon as the tunnel was paid for, the toll would be removed The promise was kept, and the toll was removed in the mid-1970s once the tunnel had been paid off. The Tunnel Authority building and toll booths are still there at the Heathcote end.
 The City of Tauranga operates a toll road running between the outlying settlement of Tauriko on State Highway 2 and central business district of the city. This toll road also act as a feeder route for the Tauranga Harbour Bridge. Tolls are collected by staff operating tollbooths at the western end of the road.
 The Northern Gateway Toll Road is a 7.5 km motorway extension to State Highway 1 just north of Auckland. Northbound, the toll road begins just before Orewa and ends via a pair of road tunnels through the Johnstone Hills near Puhoi. The toll road opened in January 2009 and gives motorists a choice between a more direct route or State Highway 17 via Orewa. Tolling is implemented through automatic vehicle license plate reading with cameras in an overhead gantry.

See also 
 Toll road
 List of toll roads
 High-occupancy toll
 Private highway
 Electronic toll collection
 TELEPASS (Italy)
 SunPass (Florida, USA)
 E-PASS (Florida, USA)
 E-ZPass (northeastern USA)
 I-PASS (Illinois, USA)
 FasTrak (California, USA)
 Pikepass (Oklahoma, USA)
 TxTag (Texas, USA)
 Highway 407 (Toronto, ON, Canada)
 CityLink (Australia)
 London congestion charge
 Turnpike trusts the first organisations empowered to collect tolls on English roads
 Malaysian expressway system
 Tunnels and bridges in Hong Kong
 Expressways of Japan
 Toll roads in Europe
 Toll roads in the United States

External links 
Turnpikes and Toll Roads in Nineteenth-Century America (EH.Net Economic History encyclopedia)
National Alliance Against Tolls (British anti toll group, but "News" pages includes USA and other countries.)

References 

Toll roads
Wireless locating
Car costs
Human geography